Hudsonelpidia is an extinct genus of small parvipelvian ichthyosaur known from British Columbia of Canada.

Description
It was collected in the Jewitt Spur locality from the Pardonet Formation, dating to the middle Norian stage of the Late Triassic, about 210 million years ago. It was found on the northern shore of the Peace Reach branch of Williston Lake. Hudsonelpidia has a very stable position in many cladistic analyses. The family Hudsonelpidiidae was named by McGowan and Motani in 2003 to include this genus.

Taxonomy
Hudsonelpidia was named by Chris McGowan in 1995 and the type species is Hudsonelpidia brevirostris.

See also

 List of ichthyosaurs
 Timeline of ichthyosaur research

References

Late Triassic ichthyosaurs of North America
Triassic British Columbia
Fossils of British Columbia
Fossil taxa described in 1995
Ichthyosauromorph genera